The Journal of Applied Microbiology is a monthly peer-reviewed scientific journal covering applied microbiology. It was established in 1939 as the Proceedings of the Society of Agricultural Bacteriologists, and published under the name Journal of Applied Bacteriology from 1954 to 1996, obtaining its current name in 1997. It is published by Wiley-Blackwell on behalf of the Society for Applied Microbiology. The editor-in-chief is Arthur Gilmour (Agri-Food and Biosciences Institute). According to the Journal Citation Reports, the journal has a 2021 impact factor of 4.061.

References

External links

Wiley-Blackwell academic journals
Monthly journals
Publications established in 1939
English-language journals
Applied microbiology journals